Heart to Heart is the fourth studio album by American country music artist Reba McEntire. It was released via Mercury Records on August 17, 1981. The album includes the singles "Today All Over Again" and "Only You and You Alone," a cover of the doo-wop standard. Heart to Heart reached #42 on Top Country Albums.

Track listing

Personnel 
 Reba McEntire – lead and backing vocals
 Hargus "Pig" Robbins – keyboards, acoustic piano 
 Ray Edenton – guitars
 Gordon Kennedy – guitars
 Pete Wade – guitars
 Chip Young – guitars
 Weldon Myrick – steel guitar
 Mike Leech – bass 
 Jerry Carrigan – drums
 Thomas Brannon – backing vocals
 Yvonne Hodges – backing vocals
 Susie McEntire – backing vocals
 Louis Dean Nunley – backing vocals
 Ricky Page – backing vocals
 Ricky Skaggs – backing vocals
 Bergen White – backing vocals
 Trish Williams – backing vocals
 Dennis Wilson – backing vocals

The Nashville String Machine
 Bergen White – string arrangements
 George Binkley III, John David Boyle, Marvin Chantry, Ray Christensen, Connie Ellisor, Carl Gorodetzky, Martin Katahn, Sheldon Kurland, Martha McCrory, Dennis Molchan, Samuel Terranova, Gary Vanosdale and Stephanie Woolf – string performers

Production 
 Jerry Kennedy – producer
 Brent King – engineer, mixing
 Steve Fralick – assistant engineer
 Mike Psanos – assistant engineer, mix assistant
 Hank Williams – mastering at Woodland Studios (Nashville, Tennessee).
 Suha Gur – digital remastering
 Bob Heimall – artwork, design 
 Dennis Carney – photography 
 Rachel Dennison – makeup

Charts

Album

Singles

References

1981 albums
Reba McEntire albums
Mercury Nashville albums
Albums produced by Jerry Kennedy